Krasny Chikoy is a rural locality (a selo) and the administrative center of Krasnochikoysky District of Zabaykalsky Krai, Russia. Population:

Geography
The village is about 380 km southeast of the regional capital Chita. It is on the right bank of the  Chikoy River with the Khentei-Daur Highlands to the south.

History
Krasny Chikoy was founded in 1670 by explorers. The first exiled Old Believers, engaged in land tenure, harvesting pine nuts, burning lime, tar, and hunting moved to the village in 1754. In 1902, there was a parochial school, post office, telegraph, district doctor and paramedic, chamber of the magistrate, distillery and oil-refinery. In 1933, it became the administrative center of the district. An airport operated in Krasny Chikoy until the 1990s.

Climate

References

Rural localities in Zabaykalsky Krai